In mathematics, Kummer's theorem is a formula for the exponent of the highest power of a prime number p that divides a given binomial coefficient.  In other words, it gives the p-adic valuation of a binomial coefficient. The theorem is named after Ernst Kummer, who proved it in a paper, .

Statement
Kummer's theorem states that for given integers n ≥ m ≥ 0 and a prime number p, the p-adic valuation  is equal to the number of carries when m is added to n − m in base p.

An equivalent formation of the theorem is as follows:

Then
 

Examples 

Carrying out the addition  in base 2 requires three carries:

{| cellpadding=5 style="border:none"
|   || 1 || 1 || 1 ||   ||   ||
|-
|   ||   ||   || 1 || 1 2
|- 
| + ||   || 1 || 1 || 1 2
|-
| style='border-top: 1px solid' |  
| style='border-top: 1px solid' | 1
| style='border-top: 1px solid' | 0
| style='border-top: 1px solid' | 1
| style='border-top: 1px solid' | 0 2
|}

Alternatively, the form involving sums of digits can be used. Then

Multinomial coefficient generalization
Kummer's theorem can be generalized to multinomial coefficients  as follows:

See also
 Lucas's theorem

References

 
 

Theorems in number theory